Carl Fredrik Bengt Lagercrantz (12 March 1887 – 22 July 1924) was a Swedish sport shooter who competed in the 1920 Summer Olympics. He won a silver medal in the team running deer, double shots competition. He also placed fourth in the team running deer, single shots event.

References

External links
profile

1887 births
1924 deaths
Swedish male sport shooters
Running target shooters
Olympic shooters of Sweden
Shooters at the 1920 Summer Olympics
Olympic silver medalists for Sweden
Olympic medalists in shooting
Medalists at the 1920 Summer Olympics

Bengt
19th-century Swedish nobility
20th-century Swedish people